Pink Cone Geyser is a cone-type geyser in the Lower Geyser Basin of Yellowstone National Park in the United States. It is part of the Pink Cone Group. Other geysers in this groups include Bead Geyser, Box Spring, Dilemma Geyser, Labial Geyser, Labial's Satellite Geyser, Narcissus Geyser, and Pink Geyser.

The interval between eruptions is 18 to 25 hours.

History
Pink Cone Geyser was named by the Hayden Survey. The geyser's siliceous sinter cone is a dark pinkish-red attributed to manganese oxide and iron oxide staining. Similar coloration occurs at some nearby geysers, including Pink Geyser and Narcissus Geyser.  This indicates a common water chemistry, but their behaviors do not affect each other.

References

Geysers of Wyoming
Geothermal features of Teton County, Wyoming
Geothermal features of Yellowstone National Park
Geysers of Teton County, Wyoming